Istanbul #2461 (also Ni 2461, L.2461) is an ancient Sumerian cuneiform tablet. Some have labelled it the world's oldest love poem. It is on display at the Istanbul Museum of the Ancient Orient (Mesopotamia Hall).

It is an erotic poem addressed to king Shu-Sin (reigned 20th or 21st century BC) by an unnamed female speaker. It is thought that the poem may be connected to a "sacred marriage" between the king and a priestess of Inanna.

Discovery 
The tablet was unearthed at Nippur, in lower Mesopotamia (modern day Iraq). It was one of several thousand Sumerian tablets found by archeologists during excavations between 1889 and 1900.

The tablet was identified among 74000 others and translated by Samuel Noah Kramer in 1951, during his years of studies in the Istanbul Museum. Kramer was deciding what works to translate next when he found the tablet in the museum drawer. He describes the moment in his book History Begins at Sumer:

Contents 
The tablet contains a balbale (a kind of Sumerian poem) which is known by the titles "Bridegroom, Spend the Night in Our House Till Dawn" or "A Love Song of Shu-Suen (Shu-Suen B)". Composed of 29 lines, this poem is a monologue directed to king Shu-Sin (ruled 1972–1964 BC, short chronology, or 2037–2029 BC, long chronology). In erotic language, the female speaker in the poem expresses her ardent desires and longings for Shu-Sin, drawing heavily on imagery related to honey and sweetness. 

The following is the start of the poem (in Kramer's translation):

The last three lines of the poem seem to contain an invitation to a sexual encounter, but in language not adequately clear to us.

The text is one of the oldest known lyric poems.

Interpretations 
It is believed that the poem is a script for the yearly "sacred marriage", a rite in which the king would symbolically marry the goddess Inanna, mate with her, and ensure fertility and prosperity for the coming year. A priestess would probably represent Inanna, the Sumerian goddess of fertility, and the king Shu-Sin would represent Dumuzi, the god of shepherds, on the eve of their union. 

Variants of the poem may have been sung during ritual ceremonies commemorating the divine marriage between the two gods all over the ancient Near East, particularly in Egypt. The translation of this tablet shed light on the Song of Solomon in the Old Testament, because some phrases are similar to the poems sung during such fertility feasts, as well as Sumerian weddings.

Literature 
 Sefati, Yitschak. "Sumerian Canonical Compositions. A. Divine Focus. 6. Love Poems: Dumuzi-Inanna Songs (1.169)". In The Context of Scripture, I: Canonical Compositions from the Biblical World. Hallo, William W. (ed). Leiden/New York/Köln: Brill, 1997. 541–542. (title: Bridegroom, spend the night in our house till dawn)
 Sefati, Yitschak. Love songs in Sumerian literature: critical edition of the Dumuzi-Inanna songs. Bar-Ilan Studies in Near Eastern Languages and Culture. Publications of the Samuel N. Kramer Institute of Assyriology. Ramat-Gan: Bar-Ilan University Press, 1998. 353–359.

References

External links 
 "A love song of Shu-Suen (Shu-Suen B)" at the Electronic Text Corpus of Sumerian Literature: translation, composite text, bibliography

Clay tablets
21st-century BC literature
20th-century BC literature
1889 archaeological discoveries
Sumerian texts
Erotic poetry
Love stories
Love poems
Culture in Istanbul
Inanna